A war medal is a military decoration awarded in time of war, as opposed to a service medal. It may refer to, for example:

War Medal (Norway)
Campaign medal
Global War on Terrorism Service Medal
British War Medal, British Empire medal for service in World War I
War Medal 1939–1945, British Commonwealth and Empire medal for service in World War II
War Medal of 1915, another name for the Ottoman Gallipoli Star